Souvignier gris is a white German wine grape variety that was created in 1983 Dr. Norbert Becker by crossing the red French wine grape variety Cabernet Sauvignon with the white German grape crossing previously created by Becker known as Bronner. Bronner is a crossing of the hybrid varieties Merzling (mother vine) and Gm 6494 (father vine).

History and lineage

Like its parent variety, Bronner, Souvignier gris was developed at the viticultural research institute of Freiburg, Germany. The variety was created in 1983.

Through its parent, Cabernet Sauvignon, Souvignier gris is a grandchild variety of the white grape variety, Sauvignon blanc, and the red grape variety Cabernet Franc. Through Bronner, which was created by Becker in 1975, the grape is related to Merzling and Geisenheim 6494. Geisenheim 6494 is a crossing of Zarya Severa with St. Laurent.

Synonyms
As a relatively recently created grape crossing, Souvignier gris is not known under many other names with only the breeding codes FR 392-83 and Freiburg 392-83 being listed as officially recognized synonyms by the Vitis International Variety Catalogue (VIVC).

References

White wine grape varieties